Thielavia is a genus of fungi in the family Chaetomiaceae. Circumscribed by German botanist Friedrich Wilhelm Zopf in 1876, Thielavia is a teleomorph of Myceliophthora. Collectively, the genus is widely distributed, and according to a 2008 estimate, contained 31 species. Thielavia heterothallica and T.  terrestris can cause infections in humans.

The genus name of Thielavia is in honour of Friedrich Joachim Sigismund von Thielau (1796–1870), who was a German forester and landowner in Breslau.

Species
As accepted by Species Fungorum;

Thielavia achromatica 
Thielavia ampullata 
Thielavia aurantiaca 
Thielavia australiensis 
Thielavia bispora 
Thielavia coactilis 
Thielavia coerulescens 
Thielavia coprophila 
Thielavia egyptiaca 
Thielavia elliptica 
Thielavia emodensis 
Thielavia expansa 
Thielavia inaequalis 
Thielavia lutescens 
Thielavia macrospora 
Thielavia magna 
Thielavia minuta 
Thielavia minutissima 
Thielavia pakistanica 
Thielavia pallidospora 
Thielavia phyllactinea 
Thielavia polygonoperda 
Thielavia pseudomaritima 
Thielavia renominata 
Thielavia submacrospora 
Thielavia wareingii 

Former species; (assume family Chaetomiaceae if not mentioned)

T. albomyces  = Melanocarpus albomyces, Sordariales
T. angulata  = Westerdykella angulata, [[Sporormiaceae
T. antarctica  = Trichocladium antarcticum
T. appendiculata  = Parathielavia appendiculata
T. arenaria  = Canariomyces arenarius, Microascaceae
T. arxii  = Pseudothielavia arxii
T. basicola  = Berkeleyomyces basicola, Ceratocystidaceae
T. boothii  = Coniochaeta boothii, Coniochaetaceae
T. bovina  = Dichlaena bovina, Aspergillaceae
T. californica  = Chaetomium pilosum
T. cephalothecoides  = Chaetomidium cephalothecoides
T. decidua  = Apodus deciduus, Neoschizotheciaceae
T. fimeti  = Chaetomidium fimeti
T. fragilis  = Hyalosphaerella fragilis
T. gigaspora  = Stolonocarpus gigasporus
T. heterothallica  = Thermothelomyces heterothallicus
T. hyalocarpa  = Cladorrhinum hyalocarpum, Podosporaceae
T. hyrcaniae  = Parathielavia hyrcaniae
T. indica  = Preussiella indica
T. intermedia  = Cladorrhinum intermedium, Podosporaceae
T. kirilenkoae  = Microthielavia ovispora
T. kuwaitensis  = Parathielavia kuwaitensis
T. leptoderma  = Chaetomidium leptoderma
T. microspora  = Canariomyces microsporus, Microascaceae
T. minor  = Pseudothielavia terricola
T. minuta , (= Thielavia minutissima]], CeratocystidaceaeT. minuta var. thermophila  = Melanocarpus thermophilus, SordarialesT. neocaledoniensis  = Isia neocaledoniensis, SordarialesT. novoguineensis  = Corynascus novoguineensisT. octospora  = Achaetomium globosumT. ovalispora  = Chaetomidium ovalisporumT. ovata  = Kernia ovata), MicroascaceaeT. ovispora  = Microthielavia ovisporaT. peruviana  = Chrysanthotrichum peruvianum T. pilosa  = Chaetomium pilosumT. pingtungia  = Chaetomidium pingtungiumT. reticulata  = Neurospora reticulata, SordariaceaeT. savoryi  = Coniochaeta savoryi, ConiochaetaceaeT. sepedonium  = Corynascus sepedoniumT. setosa  = Chaetomidium setosumT. soppittii  = Microthecium brevirostre, CeratostomataceaeT. spirotricha  = Botryotrichum spirotrichum,T. subfimeti  = Chaetomium subfimeti,T. subthermophila  = Canariomyces subthermophilus, MicroascaceaeT. terrestris  = Thermothielavioides terrestris,T. terricola  = Pseudothielavia terricola,T. terricola f. minor  = Pseudothielavia terricola,T. terricola var. minor  = Pseudothielavia terricola,T. tetraspora  = Boothiella tetraspora, SordariaceaeT. thermophila  = Chaetomidium thermophilum,T. tortuosa  = Condenascus tortuosus,T. trichorobusta  = Chaetomidium trichorobustum,T. variospora  = Pseudothielavia hamadae'',

References

External links

Sordariales
Taxa named by Friedrich Wilhelm Zopf